The Hill County Courthouse is a courthouse building in the town of Hillsboro, Hill County, Texas. It was listed on the National Register of Historic Places in 1971.  The building was designed by architect W.C. Dodson using a Second Empire style. It was completed in 1890.

The building was designated as a Recorded Texas Historic Landmark in 1964, and was listed on the National Register in 1971.

Structure
The building is a limestone structure fronted by Corinthian columns and having mansard roofs, with three floors of courtrooms and a seven-story clock tower rising from the middle.

1993 electrical fire
On January 1, 1993, the courthouse was heavily damaged by an electrical fire. It was rebuilt, courtesy of donations from around the world and two concerts sponsored by Hill County native Willie Nelson. The courthouse won the Downtown Association's 1999 award for "Best Restoration".

References

Buildings and structures in Hill County, Texas
National Register of Historic Places in Hill County, Texas
County courthouses in Texas
Second Empire architecture in Texas
Buildings and structures completed in 1890